Bothriomyrmex kusnezovi is a species of ant in the genus Bothriomyrmex. Described by Emery in 1925, the species is endemic to China, Kazakhstan and Kyrgyzstan.

References

Bothriomyrmex
Hymenoptera of Asia
Insects of China
Insects of Central Asia
Insects described in 1925